World Phenomenology Institute (WPI) is an academic organization founded in 1976 (originally named the World Institute for Advanced Phenomenological Research and Learning) to promote scholarship in the area of phenomenology. The organization was founded by Anna-Teresa Tymieniecka.

See also 
 Society for Phenomenology and Existential Philosophy
 British Society for Phenomenology
Phenomenology (philosophy)
Existential phenomenology
Edmund Husserl
Edith Stein
Martin Heidegger
Maurice Merleau-Ponty
Jean-Paul Sartre
Paul Ricoeur
Emmanuel Levinas
Jacques Derrida

External links 
WPI website

Phenomenology
Philosophical societies in the United States
Continental philosophy organizations